Fred Astaire (May 10, 1899 – June 22, 1987) and Ginger Rogers (July 16, 1911 – April 25, 1995) were dance partners in a total of 10 films, nine of them with RKO Radio Pictures from 1933 to 1939, and one, The Barkleys of Broadway, with MGM in 1949, their only color film.

Career at RKO
Astaire and Rogers were first paired together in the 1933 movie Flying Down to Rio. They were cast in supporting roles, with fifth and fourth billing, respectively, but their performance in the "Carioca" number was the highlight of the film, and RKO Radio Pictures was eager to capitalize on their popularity.

In 1934, Astaire and Rogers made the musical movie The Gay Divorcee, which co-starred Edward Everett Horton. It was their first joint starring roles in a movie and grossed even more than Flying Down to Rio, with worldwide rentals of $1.8 million; the movie also featured the classic Cole Porter song "Night and Day". The song "The Continental" from the movie was a hit and was also the first song to win the Academy Award for Best Original Song at the 1934 Academy Awards.

Astaire and Rogers made two movies in 1935. In Roberta, which featured the song "I Won't Dance", Astaire and Rogers received second and third billing, respectively, behind Irene Dunne. It was a hit, with worldwide rentals of $2.3 million. Top Hat, which also co-starred Horton, marked the first time the duo had a film written solely for them, and it proved to be one of the most successful films of the year, with worldwide rentals of $3.2 million. It was the most profitable film RKO made in the 1930s, with profits of $1.3 million.

They were voted fourth on the Top Ten Money Making Stars Poll for 1934–1935, as published by Quigley Publishing Company.

By 1936, Astaire and Rogers were top box office names. That year they made another two movies together: Follow the Fleet and Swing Time, which were both hits, earning worldwide rentals of $2.7 million and $2.6 million, respectively. Follow the Fleet boasted another Irving Berlin score, which featured the vignette "Let's Face the Music and Dance". Swing Time spawned the Oscar-winning song "The Way You Look Tonight", written by Jerome Kern with lyrics by Dorothy Fields, which Astaire sang to Rogers. John Mueller has cited Swing Time for possessing "the greatest dancing in the history of the universe." The dance sequences for Swing Time (e.g. "Never Gonna Dance") are considered by Arlene Croce to be the high point of their art. This scene took 47 takes to perfect, during which the dancers had to ascend stairs, spinning, until they perfected it. By the end of the shoot, Rogers' feet were bleeding. They were voted the third biggest money making stars of 1936 in the annual Quigley poll.

Astaire and Rogers made one movie in 1937, Shall We Dance, once again co-starring Edward Everett Horton. Although the film was RKO's biggest film of the year, with worldwide rentals of $2.2 million, it did not perform as well as the studio had expected. Shall We Dance had the first Hollywood score by the brothers George and Ira Gershwin, and included the song "They Can't Take That Away from Me". Although Astaire and Rogers would go on to make two more films together for RKO, the film's relative disappointment at the box office was the beginning of the end of their partnership.

After an unusually long period apart, Astaire and Rogers made only one movie together in 1938, the 80-minute Carefree. During their time apart, Rogers appeared in the successful movie Stage Door, while Astaire appeared alongside Joan Fontaine in the musical A Damsel in Distress, the first film he had made to lose money. Carefree marked a departure for their on-screen formula, featuring Astaire in a role unlike his usual typecast persona, as well as less emphasis on the musical elements. Carefree was originally supposed to include sequences shot in Technicolor, but RKO considered the cost prohibitive, so it was filmed in black and white. This movie feature an Irving Berlin musical score with only four songs, the fewest in any Astaire and Rogers film. While the film was well received by critics, with Motion Picture Herald's William R. Weaver calling it "the greatest Astaire-Rogers picture", it was their most expensive film to date, costing $1.3 million and ultimately losing money for the studio, despite worldwide rentals of $1.7 million.

In 1939, Astaire and Rogers made The Story of Vernon and Irene Castle. It was the end of their partnership for ten years. Despite several successful films, RKO was facing bankruptcy. Due to the high cost and low profit of the most recent Astaire-Rogers vehicles, along with the stars' mutual desire to branch out, RKO announced the end of the on-screen partnership. Although their relationship remained amicable, both wanted to explore new avenues. Rogers was interested in more dramatic roles than those she was offered with Astaire. Meanwhile, Astaire, who worked with many dancers throughout his career, wished to be known as a dancer in his own right, rather than always being paired with one permanent partner.

Hiatus
Rogers had long been keen to pursue more dramatic roles, which she successfully managed after the end of her collaboration with Astaire. At the 1941 Academy Awards ceremony, Rogers won the Academy Award for Best Actress for her performance in Kitty Foyle and by the mid-1940s she was the highest-paid actress in Hollywood, although her career waned post war.

Astaire continued to make musicals including Holiday Inn (1942) with Bing Crosby, Sky's The Limit (1943) with Joan Leslie and Blue Skies (1946), his second and last movie with Crosby. He also partnered with numerous other dancers, including Rita Hayworth, Cyd Charisse and Judy Garland. Fearing his career was failing, Blue Skies was due to be Astaire's last film, after which he retired for two years. In 1948 Gene Kelly was due to star in MGM's Easter Parade alongside Judy Garland, but he broke his ankle, and at Kelly's request, MGM convinced Astaire to fill in, ending his retirement.

Reunion and later life 
Due to their success as a partnership, Garland and Astaire were due to reunite for The Barkleys of Broadway, but Garland was forced to drop out due to illness and Rogers took her place. The film, released in 1949, was their only movie for MGM and their only color film. During production, Astaire received an honorary Academy Award, which was presented to him by Rogers. When Astaire and Rogers filmed the last dance in this film, Missouri Waltz, they attracted a large crowd of co-workers and crew members from RKO and numerous other studios, all of whom attended to bid an emotional farewell to the great dance team. This film was greeted with joy by critics, who were thrilled to see the partnership together once again. The Barkleys of Broadway would be Astaire and Rogers' final movie together, although both would continue to make films with other stars.

In 1950, Rogers presented an honorary Academy Award to Astaire "for his unique artistry and his contributions to the technique of musical pictures."

Throughout the 1950s, Rogers' film career declined, and she began to focus more on Broadway roles; she received great acclaim for her portrayals of the title characters in Mame and Hello, Dolly!. On several occasions, she did express interest in making another film with Astaire, although this never came to fruition. Astaire remained in the film industry and also branched out into television. Despite going in different directions career-wise, the duo remained friends for the rest of their lives. At a 1979 event honoring Rogers, Astaire said, "She’s been such a wonderful partner. There are all kinds of rumors that we used to fight. And we didn’t. I’ve been denying it for the last twenty years or more." In an interview the following year, Rogers shared this sentiment; “Studio publicity men were always trying to make it look like we fought, just to keep our names in the papers.”

After Astaire died in 1987, Rogers said in an interview, “I just adored and admired Fred with all my heart... He was the best partner anyone could ever have.”

Filmography

Notes

American dance groups
Couples
Astaire and Rogers
Fred Astaire